Bene merenti de patria is a silver medal created in 1923. It is awarded by the Quebec patriotic Saint-Jean-Baptiste Society to a "compatriot having rendered exceptional services to the homeland".

Laureates 
1924: Marie Lacoste Gérin-Lajoie
1924: Laurent-Olivier David
1964: Sister Marie-Stéphane
1964: Wilfrid Laurier
1965: Claude Champagne 
1965: Lionel Daunais
1965: Aline Hector Perrier (fr)
1966: Annette Lasalle-Leduc
1966: Jean Vallerand
1966: Eugène Lapierre
1968: Dr. Pierre Grondin
1970: Clermont Pépin
1972: Dr. Armand Frappier
1974: Gustave Bellefleur
1975: Father Gustave Lamarche (fr)
1977: Raymond Barbeau
1977: Jean-Charles Bonenfant (posthumous)
1982: Séraphin Marion
1982: Jean Rougeau (known as Johnny Rougeau)
1983: Jeannine Séguin
1987: Gilles Proulx
1989: Pierre-Louis Mallen (first non-Quebecer)
1990: Alice Poznanska-Parizeau (posthumous)
1991: Mary Travers (known as La Bolduc, posthumous)
1992: Dollard Ménard and Eugenia Dias
1997: Rosaire Morin (fr)
2005: Raymond Lévesque
2011: Réginald Chartrand (fr)
2012: Marcel Masse
2015: Gilles Rhéaume
2019: Yvon Groulx 
2019:  Yves Saint-Denis

References
"Liste des Lauréates et lauréats du prix Bene Merenti De Patria" at Bilan du Siècle

See also 
Quebec nationalism
Patriotism
Awards

Saint-Jean-Baptiste Society
Quebec awards